Oligostigma flavimarginale is a moth in the family Crambidae. It was described by Warren in 1899. It is found in Brazil.

References

Acentropinae
Moths described in 1899